Postencephalitic may refer to:
 Postencephalitic parkinsonism
 Postencephalitic trophic ulcer